The Former Residence of Zhang Jingjiang, also known as Hall of Zunde, is the birthplace and former residence of Zhang Jingjiang, one of the "Four Elder Statesmen" of the Kuomintang.

History
The Former Residence of Zhang Jingjiang was built by Zhang Songxian, the grandfather of Zhang Jingjiang, in 1898, during the region of Guangxu Emperor in late Qing dynasty (1644–1911).

In March 2013, it was designated as a Major National Historical and Cultural Site by the State Council of China.

Architecture
The house comprise 7 rooms. Some wooden plaques with couplets written by Zhang Jian, Sun Yat-sen, Tan Yankai, Weng Tonghe and Chen Lifu are hung on the pillars of the house.

References

Major National Historical and Cultural Sites in Zhejiang
Traditional folk houses in Zhejiang
Buildings and structures in Huzhou
Tourist attractions in Huzhou